Suttinun Phuk-hom (born November 19, 1984), simply known as M is a Thai professional footballer who plays as a centre back. He played for Thailand national team until 2018.

International career
Suttinun made his Debut for the U-23 side during the SEA Games 2009. He has scored 2 goals against Zimbabwe in a friendly match. Suttinun is part of Thailand's squad in the 2014 AFF Suzuki Cup. In May 2015, he was called up to Thailand to play in the 2018 FIFA World Cup qualification (AFC) against Vietnam.

International

International goals

Honours

Club
Chonburi
 Kor Royal Cup (4): 2008, 2009, 2011, 2012

Uthai Thani
Thai League 3 (1): 2021–22
Thai League 3 Northern Region (1): 2021–22

International
Thailand U-23
 Sea Games  Gold Medal (1); 2007

Thailand
 ASEAN Football Championship (1): 2014

References

External links
 

1987 births
Living people
Suttinan Phuk-hom
Suttinan Phuk-hom
Association football central defenders
Suttinan Phuk-hom
Suttinan Phuk-hom
Suttinan Phuk-hom
Suttinan Phuk-hom
Suttinan Phuk-hom
Suttinan Phuk-hom
Footballers at the 2010 Asian Games
Southeast Asian Games medalists in football
Suttinan Phuk-hom
Competitors at the 2007 Southeast Asian Games
Suttinan Phuk-hom